The Brearley School is an all-girls private school in New York City, located on the Upper East Side neighborhood in the borough of Manhattan. The school is divided into lower (kindergarten – grade 4), middle (grades 5–8) and upper (grades 9–12) schools, with approximately 50 to 60 students per grade.

In addition to being a member of the New York Interschool Association, Brearley is considered a sister school of the all-boys Collegiate School, the all-girls Spence School and the nearby all-girls Chapin School, with which it shares an after-school program and some classes.

History 

Samuel A. Brearley founded The Brearley School in 1884, and remained the head of school until 1886, when he died of typhoid fever. James G. Croswell was the next head until his death in 1915. Since 1926, Brearley has been headed by women, first by Millicent Carey McIntosh. In December 2011, Jane Foley Fried replaced former headmistress Stephanie J. Hull who had resigned for undisclosed reasons.  Jane Foley Fried became Brearley's 15th head of school.

In the early 1900s, Brearley moved from East 45th Street to West 44th Street and then in 1912 to Park Avenue and East 61st Street, where the primary program was added. The school then moved to a new building in 1929 on East 83rd Street. Brearley opened a new building at 590 East 83rd Street in Fall 2019, one block away from its existing building at 610 East 83rd street. Brearley plans to renovate 610 during the summers. For the most part, the lower school will reside in 590 and the middle and upper schools will be in 610, although older students may go from building to building for different classes.

Academics 
The school's curriculum is based on the liberal arts. The student-to-faculty ratio is 6:1.

Language instruction is offered in Ancient Greek, Latin, French, Spanish, and Mandarin Chinese.

Students have access to two computer laboratories — one serving the Lower School, the other the Middle and Upper Schools. In addition, there are three smaller computer workrooms, one for middle schoolers and two for upper schoolers, as well as the science-projects room and laptops for use in the library and classrooms. Students in grades 7 and 8 are given iPads for the school year to aid with work in classes and assignments at home. In high school, students are expected to bring their own device, such as a laptop or iPad.

Rankings and college attendance 

In 2008, Brearley was ranked number two in the country by The Wall Street Journal based on its ranking of students matriculating to eight selected colleges and universities. It was ranked second-best prep school in the United States and best all-girls school by Forbes in 2013. A 2019–20 survey concluded that Brearley was the second-best girls school in the country and the fifth-best private K-12 school in the country.

Student body 

As of 2019, Brearley enrolled 724 students in K-12.  Students of color represented approximately half of the student body. The 2018–19 tuition was $49,680. Approximately 20% of the students received the $6.1 million that was available for financial assistance.

Sports facilities 
A separate building, the "Field House" on East 87th Street, has facilities for physical education and athletics including track, soccer, basketball, tennis, badminton, volleyball, lacrosse and field hockey.

Brearley fields varsity teams in 13 sports.

The school's team colors are 
red and white, and its mascot is a beaver.

Notable alumnae 

Mabel Choate, Gardener, collector and philanthropist
Abiola Abrams, filmmaker, author, and television personality
Modupe Akinola, psychologist and academic
Genevieve Angelson, actor
Blue Balliett, author of Chasing Vermeer
Anne Baxter, actor
Mary Ellin Barrett, novelist
Mary Catherine Bateson, writer and anthropologist
Devika Bhise, actor
Jenny Bicks, screenwriter, What a Girl Wants and Sex and the City
Margaret McKelvy Bird, archaeologist
Susan Berresford, foundation executive
Henrietta Buckmaster, author
Mary Steichen Calderone, physician and public-health advocate
Oona, Lady Chaplin, social leader
Eva Chen, director of fashion partnerships at Instagram
Lucinda Childs, dancer and choreographer
Jill Clayburgh, actor
Emily Cross, fencer. Olympic silver medalist.
Alexandra Daddario, actress and model
Fernanda Eberstadt, novelist, essayist, critic.
Anne d'Harnoncourt, museum director
Elizabeth Fishel, journalist and writer, Reunion: The Girls We Used to Be, the Women We Became
Lacey Fosburgh, journalist and author, Closing Time: The True Story of the Goodbar Murder
Virginia Kneeland Frantz, pathologist, pioneer in the study of pancreatic tumors
Betty Furness, actress, consumer affairs activist, current affairs commentator
Virginia Gildersleeve, dean, Barnard College, statesperson
Jane Ginsburg, law professor
Betsy Gotbaum, Public Advocate for the City of New York
Isca Greenfield-Sanders, artist
Emily Hoffman, socialite 
Ruth Sulzberger Holmberg, publisher
Winifred Holt, sculptor, welfare worker. Founder of the nonprofit that is now Lighthouse International
Nora Johnson, novelist, The World of Henry Orient
Judith Jones, editor and food writer
Caroline Kennedy, diplomat, author and philanthropist
Nancy Krieger, epidemiologist
Maude Latour, singer-songwriter
Téa Leoni, actress
Bethel Leslie, actress
Sarah Lewis, Professor at Harvard University, Art Curator, and TED Talk presenter
Priscilla Johnson McMillan, journalist, translator, author, historian
Caryn Marooney, business executive
Ruth Messinger, Manhattan Borough President
Sara Moulton, chef, author and television personality
Elisabeth Murdoch, media executive
Victoria Newhouse, architecture critic
Diane Paulus, opera and theater director. Artistic Director, American Repertory Theater
Mary Louise Perlman, musician
Kathleen Ridder, philanthropist, educator, writer, equality for women activist
Mary Rodgers, children's author and composer
Anne Roiphe, journalist, novelist
Katie Roiphe, writer
Niki de Saint Phalle, artist
Dorothy Schiff, publisher of the New York Post
Rose Schlossberg
Tatiana Schlossberg
Kyra Sedgwick, actor
Maggie Shnayerson, journalist and blogger
Helen Farr Sloan, educator, artist, philanthropist
Sarah Solovay, singer-songwriter
Kim Stolz, fashion model and television personality
Marina Vaizey, art critic and author
Elizabeth Chai Vasarhelyi, Academy Award winner, director and producer of documentary films
Emily Vermeule, scholar and archaeologist
Erica Wagner, literary editor for The Times
Frieda Schiff Warburg, philanthropist
Katharine Weymouth, former publisher of The Washington Post
Flora Payne Whitney, patron of the arts

Affiliated organizations 
National Association of Independent Schools
New York State Association of Independent Schools
New York Interschool Association

References

External links 
The Brearley School homepage

Educational institutions established in 1884
Private elementary schools in Manhattan
Private middle schools in Manhattan
Private high schools in Manhattan
Private K-12 schools in Manhattan
Preparatory schools in New York City
Girls' schools in New York City
1884 establishments in New York (state)